The 2017–18 BBL season was the 31st campaign of the British Basketball League since the league's establishment in 1987. The season featured 12 teams from across England and Scotland.

The Leicester Riders became regular season champions for the third season in succession, winning 104–75 against Plymouth Raiders at the Plymouth Pavilions on 8 April 2018. The Riders then added the playoff title with an 81–60 win over the London Lions in the final. This victory gave Rob Paternostro's team a second consecutive treble, having won the BBL Trophy earlier in the campaign.

Teams

Venues

Personnel and sponsoring

Coaching changes

Regular season

Standings

Playoffs

Bracket

Quarter-finals
The quarter-final matchups and tip-off times were confirmed by the league, on 30 April 2018.

(1) Leicester Riders vs. (8) Sheffield Sharks

(2) London Lions vs. (7) Worcester Wolves

(3) Newcastle Eagles vs. (6) Bristol Flyers

(4) Glasgow Rocks vs. (5) Surrey Scorchers

Semi-finals
The semi-final matchups and tip-off times were confirmed by the league, on 6 May 2018.

(1) Leicester Riders vs. (6) Bristol Flyers

(2) London Lions vs. (4) Glasgow Rocks

Final

Awards

Monthly awards

Season awards

See also
2017–18 BBL Cup
2017–18 BBL Trophy

References

External links

British Basketball League seasons
1
British